Abdoulaye Ouzérou (born 24 October 1985 in Parakou) is a Beninese international football player who currently plays for Buffles du Borgou FC.

Career 
Ouzerou began his career with Energie FC and signed in 2007 with Buffles FC. He left than in summer 2008 Buffles FC and joined on loan to Al Madina Tripoli of the Libyan Premier League.

International career 
The uncapped striker called up as back-up for the 2008 African Cup of Nations in Ghana. His second call up for Benin was on 29 March 2009 against Ghana.

References

1985 births
Living people
Beninese footballers
Benin international footballers
Buffles du Borgou FC players
Beninese expatriate sportspeople in Libya
2008 Africa Cup of Nations players
Expatriate footballers in Libya
People from Parakou
Energie FC players

Association football forwards